M. Craig Barnes (born 1956) is an American Presbyterian minister and professor who serves as president of Princeton Theological Seminary.

Biography and Career 
Born on August 28, 1956, and raised on Long Island, Barnes attended The King's College in New York City, where he graduated with a Bachelor of Arts degree in history, in 1978. He went on to graduate from Princeton Theological Seminary, in 1981, with a Master of Divinity degree. Barnes then earned a Doctor of Philosophy degree in the history of Christianity from the University of Chicago Divinity School, in 1992, under the supervision of Martin Marty. For his doctoral studies, he wrote a dissertation titled John R. Mott: A Conversionist in a Pluralist World.

In 1981, Barnes was ordained as a minister in the PC(USA), serving in PC(USA) congregations in Colorado Springs, Colorado, and Madison, Wisconsin. In 1993, he became senior pastor of National Presbyterian Church in Washington, DC, serving until 2002, when he accepted a teaching position at Pittsburgh Theological Seminary, in Pittsburgh, Pennsylvania. One year later, while serving as Robert Meneilly Professor of Pastoral Ministry, Barnes accepted a call to Shadyside Presbyterian Church as senior pastor. On October 8, 2012, Princeton Theological Seminary announced that Barnes was selected to succeed the retiring Iain Torrance as president. Barnes took up his duties as president on January 1, 2013, and was formally installed as president on October 23, 2013. At Princeton Seminary, he also serves as professor of pastoral ministry.

Barnes is married and has a grown daughter and two teenage sons.

Works

Thesis

Books

Articles

References

1956 births
20th-century Presbyterian ministers
21st-century Calvinist and Reformed ministers
21st-century Presbyterians
The King's College (New York City) alumni
Living people
Pittsburgh Theological Seminary faculty
Presbyterian Church (USA) teaching elders
Presidents of Calvinist and Reformed seminaries
Princeton Theological Seminary alumni
Princeton Theological Seminary faculty
University of Chicago Divinity School alumni
20th-century American clergy
21st-century American clergy